Sawila, or Tanglapui, is a Papuan language of the Alor archipelago. Dialects are Sawila proper, Lona, Salimana, Lalamana, Sileba. Sawila speakers refer to their language as Manata.

Phonology

References

External links
 Sawila at The Language Archive

Tanglapui languages
Languages of Indonesia